The 2012–13 Central Coast Mariners season was the Central Coast Mariners's eighth A-League season. It included the 2012–13 A-League season (and the competition's subsequent finals) as well as the 2013 AFC Champions League.

Season overview

Squad

Transfers

In

Out

Pre-season and friendlies

Competitions
All times listed in Gosford local time.

Overall

A-League

League table

Matches

A-League Finals series

AFC Champions League

Group stage

Knockout stage

Squad statistics

Appearances and goals

|-
|colspan="14"|Players no longer at the club:

|}

Goal scorers

Disciplinary record

Awards
Australia U20 Player of the year: Mathew Ryan
A-League Young Player of the Month (November): Tom Rogic
A-League Young Player of the Month (February): Bernie Ibini-Isei
A-League Young Player of the Month (March): Trent Sainsbury
2012-13 A-League Golden Boot: Daniel McBreen
Joe Marston Medal: Daniel McBreen
PFA A-League Team of the Year: Daniel McBreen, Michael McGlinchey, Trent Sainsbury

References

External links
 Official website

Central Coast Mariners FC seasons
Central Coast